Niklas Jahn (born 19 January 2001) is a German footballer who plays as a forward for ZFC Meuselwitz.

Career
Jahn made his professional debut for Carl Zeiss Jena in the 3. Liga on 22 July 2019, coming on as a substitute in the 86th minute for Marian Sarr in the 1–2 home loss against FC Ingolstadt.

References

External links
 Profile at DFB.de
 Profile at kicker.de

2001 births
Living people
German footballers
Association football forwards
FC Carl Zeiss Jena players
ZFC Meuselwitz players
3. Liga players
Regionalliga players